Augustinus ("Guus") Wilhelmus Johannes Marines Vogels (born March 26, 1975 in Naaldwijk, South Holland) is a Dutch field hockey goalkeeper, who twice won Olympic gold medals with the national squad: at the 1996 Summer Olympics in Atlanta and four years later, at the 2000 Summer Olympics in Sydney.

In 2004 he was the starter and won the silver medal with the Dutch team in Athens. Vogels made his debut in January 1996, at the Olympic Qualifier Tournament in Barcelona, in the match against Belgium: 8–4. He plays for HGC (H.O.C. Gazellen-Combinatie) in the Dutch League (Hoofdklasse). Vogels was named Best Goalkeeper at the 2004 Champions Trophy in Lahore, Pakistan. Also Vogels was named the best player in the Hockey World Cup 2010 held at New Delhi.

External links
 
 Dutch Hockey Federation

1975 births
Living people
Dutch male field hockey players
Male field hockey goalkeepers
Field hockey players at the 1996 Summer Olympics
Field hockey players at the 2000 Summer Olympics
2002 Men's Hockey World Cup players
Field hockey players at the 2004 Summer Olympics
2006 Men's Hockey World Cup players
Field hockey players at the 2008 Summer Olympics
2010 Men's Hockey World Cup players
Medalists at the 2004 Summer Olympics
Olympic field hockey players of the Netherlands
Olympic gold medalists for the Netherlands
Olympic silver medalists for the Netherlands
Olympic medalists in field hockey
People from Naaldwijk
Medalists at the 2000 Summer Olympics
Medalists at the 1996 Summer Olympics
HGC players
Sportspeople from South Holland